Herbert James Stephens (13 May 1909 – September 1987) was an English professional footballer, best remembered for his time as an outside forward in the Football League with Brighton & Hove Albion. At the time of his retirement in 1948, Stephens was Brighton's second-highest goalscorer.

Career

Brentford 
An outside forward, Stephens began his career at amateur club Ealing Association and joined Third Division South club Brentford in February 1931. He made just six appearances for the club and scored one goal, before his departure at the end of the 1934–35 season. Stephens spent much of his time with the club in the reserve team, with whom he won two London Combination titles and the 1934–35 London Challenge Cup.

Brighton & Hove Albion 
Stephens joined Third Division South club Brighton & Hove Albion in June 1935. He was Brighton's top scorer in the 1936–37 season, with 26 goals in all competitions and again in 1938–39, with 17 goals. After competitive football was suspended in 1939 due to the outbreak of the Second World War, Stephens remained with the Gulls. He retired in 1948, after scoring 86 goals in 180 league games and at the time he was Brighton's second-highest goalscorer. Including his tally in wartime matches, Stephens scored 174 goals for the Gulls.

Personal life 
A Kent native, Stephens was born in Chatham and died in Thanet.

Career statistics

Honours 
Brentford Reserves
 London Combination (2): 1931–32, 1932–33
 London Challenge Cup (1): 1934–35

References

1909 births
1987 deaths
Sportspeople from Chatham, Kent
Footballers from Kent
English footballers
Association football forwards
Brentford F.C. players
Brighton & Hove Albion F.C. players
English Football League players
Brentford F.C. wartime guest players